Mom + Pop Music is a New York City-based independent record label whose current roster includes Courtney Barnett, Madeon, Tom Morello, Porter Robinson, Tycho, Tash Sultana, Sunflower Bean, Beach Bunny, Caamp, Del Water Gap and more. Founder and president Michael Goldstone launched the label in the summer of 2008, with the help of Q Prime Management owners Cliff Burnstein and Peter Mensch. In 2009, Thaddeus Rudd joined the label as Goldstone's partner and co-president.

According to Goldstone, "Our ambition for Mom + Pop has been and always will be to build a collaborative label with transparency and sincere respect for our artists’ creative controls."

Mom + Pop first opened its doors in Times Square, across from the Brill Building. In 2013, the company moved its New York City office to Manhattan's NoMad district, just north of Madison Square Park and the Flatiron Building. Between its New York City and Los Angeles offices, Mom + Pop employs 15 people, ranging in responsibilities from A&R to digital marketing and design.

Mom + Pop's roster includes Grammy Award-nominee and ARIA Award-winner Courtney Barnett, Rage Against the Machine and Audioslave co-founder/guitarist Tom Morello, APRA Award-nominee and ARIA Award-winner Tash Sultana, R&B singer-songwriter Alina Baraz, German-Canadian-English singer-songwriter Alice Merton, Bangladeshi-American producer Jai Wolf, and indie rock trio Sunflower Bean, among others. The label's first two signings were An Horse and Joshua Radin, but Mom + Pop would go on to sign a diverse array of artists, including Tokyo Police Club, Freelance Whales, Sleigh Bells, Metric, Ingrid Michaelson, and Andrew Bird. Over the years, they continued to grow, bringing on Lucius, FIDLAR, Poliça, Neon Indian, and Jagwar Ma. Goldstone and Rudd signed Flume in 2012, followed by Courtney Barnett in 2014. Flume went on to win a Grammy Award for Best Electronic Album, and Courtney Barnett ended 2016 with a Grammy nomination for Best New Artist. In 2017, Mom + Pop signed Alice Merton to bring her music to the United States, after topping charts in Germany. In June 2020, Goldstone and Rudd were honored on Billboard Magazine's annual "Indie Power Players" list as music executives who are "driving artists to chart-topping success outside the major-label machinery."

Artists

Current

Alice Merton
Alina Baraz
Ashe
Bayonne
Beach Bunny
Caamp
Courtney Barnett
Del Water Gap
Evann McIntosh
Fidlar
FKJ
Hinds
Hotel Garuda
Jai Wolf
Lucius
Maya Hawke
Madeon
Orion Sun
Porter Robinson
Raffaella
Sleater-Kinney
Sunflower Bean
Tash Sultana
Tegan and Sara
Tom Morello
Tycho

Former

An Horse
Andrew Bird
Animal Kingdom
Cloud Nothings (with Carpark Records)
DMA's
EL EL
Flume
Freelance Whales
Hunters
Ingrid Michaelson
Jagwar Ma
The Jezabels
Jon Spencer Blues Explosion
Joshua Radin
Kindness
Lady Lamb
Metric
Mikhael Paskalev
MNDR
Neon Indian
Poliça
Sleeper Agent
Sleigh Bells
Smith Westerns
Tei Shi
Tired Pony
Tokyo Police Club
White Sea
Wild Cub
Wavves

See also
 List of record labels

References

External links
 

2008 establishments in New York City
Alternative rock record labels
American independent record labels
Entertainment companies based in New York City
New York (state) record labels
Record labels established in 2008
Sony Music